Simon Anthony Segars (born 17 October 1967) is the former chief executive officer (CEO) of ARM Holdings plc from 2013 to 2022. ARM is the UK-largest semiconductor IP company headquartered in Cambridge, England, and was acquired by SoftBank Group for £24.3 billion ($32 billion) in 2016.

Education
Segars was educated at the University of Sussex where he was awarded a Bachelor of Engineering degree in electronic engineering. He went on to study for a Master of Science degree from the School of Computer Science at the University of Manchester in 1996 on low power microprocessor design in the ARM6 chip, supervised by Steve Furber.

Career
After working for Standard Telephones and Cables, Segars joined ARM in 1991 as its 16th employee. He led development of the ARM7TM and ARM9TM Thumb® processor families.

In July 2013 he succeeded Warren East as CEO of ARM. He is a member of the board of directors at Electronic Design Automation Ltd, the EDA Consortium, the Global Semiconductor Alliance and Dolby Laboratories Inc.

In February 2022, Rene Haas succeeded Segars as CEO, with Segars leaving Arm.

Awards and honours
In 2016, Segars was named the UKtech50 most influential person in UK Information technology by Computer Weekly.

References

Alumni of the University of Manchester
People associated with the Department of Computer Science, University of Manchester
British chief executives
Living people
1967 births
Arm Holdings people